CLX is the standard X Window System client library for Common Lisp, equivalent to the Xlib library for the C programming language. CLX is written solely in Common Lisp; it does not use Xlib.

CLX contains data types, functions and macros to interact with an X server by sending requests and receiving events and replies.

References

External links
 CLX on the CLiki
 CLX — Common LISP X Interface

Common Lisp
Common Lisp (programming language) software